Billy Shilton (born 9 October 1998) is a British Paralympic table tennis player. He won bronze in the Men's team – Class 8 at the 2020 Summer Paralympics in Tokyo.

References

Living people
1998 births
Sportspeople from Gloucester
Table tennis players at the 2020 Summer Paralympics
Medalists at the 2020 Summer Paralympics
Paralympic bronze medalists for Great Britain
English male table tennis players
Paralympic table tennis players of Great Britain